Gene Washington (born January 14, 1947) is an American former professional football player who was a wide receiver in the National Football League (NFL) for the San Francisco 49ers and Detroit Lions. He played college football for Stanford University, and is a member of Delta Tau Delta International Fraternity. He was the director of football operations for the NFL from 1994 to 2009. He is also a former board member of the National Park Foundation. He has two children, Daniel and Kelly.

Living and playing in California gave Washington the opportunity to appear in a number of films and television series. He also served as a commentator for NBC's NFL coverage in the early 1980s and sports anchor at KABC-TV in the late 1980s.

He was the guest of US Secretary of State Condoleezza Rice at a State Dinner for Elizabeth II and a State Dinner for Ghanaian President John Kufuor.

In 2015, the Professional Football Researchers Association named Washington to the PFRA Hall of Very Good Class of 2015

Film and television
 Banacek episode "Let's Hear It for a Living Legend" (1972) as Clay Mills
 The Mod Squad episode "The Connection" (1972)
 Black Gunn (1972) as Elmo
 The Black Six as Bubba Daniels
 Airport 1975 (1974) as himself, uncredited
 McMillan & Wife episode "Guilt by Association" as Luke Johnson
 Lady Cocoa (1975) as Doug

References

External links

1947 births
American football wide receivers
Detroit Lions players
Living people
National Conference Pro Bowl players
National Football League announcers
San Francisco 49ers players
Stanford Cardinal football players
Western Conference Pro Bowl players
American football quarterbacks
Long Beach Polytechnic High School alumni